Vinda (the winding river) is a river in Sørkapp Land at Spitsbergen, Svalbard. It flows from Wiederfjellet along Bungebreen and reaches the sea at the northern side of Røysneset.

References

Rivers of Spitsbergen